Robert Jesse Lindfield (1901–1959) was an Australian rugby league footballer who played in the 1920s and 1930s.

Background

Playing career
Lindfield came to Western Suburbs in 1923. He played eleven seasons for Wests between 1923 and 1934. He played hooker in two premiership winning teams: 1930 and 1934. 

He shifted to Canterbury-Bankstown for two seasons between 1935 and 1936 before retiring.  Budgen played in Canterbury's first ever game as a club in Round 1 1935 against North Sydney at North Sydney Oval which ended in a 20–5 loss.

Lindfield represented New South Wales on five occasions in 1928.

Death

References

1901 births
1959 deaths
Australian rugby league players
Canterbury-Bankstown Bulldogs players
New South Wales rugby league team players
Rugby league hookers
Rugby league players from Orange, New South Wales
Rugby league second-rows
Western Suburbs Magpies players